Irishtown (also, Irish Town) is a former settlement in Amador County, California, United States. The townsite lies within the boundaries of Pine Grove. Irishtown is a former Miwok settlement.

History

When the first white people arrived to the area, en route to finding mines, they saw a "city of wigwams."  The Miwok also left signs of bedrock mortars in the stone. These bedrock mortars are remnants of food processing/grinding once used by the Miwok who lived in the area.

Irishtown is now a part of Pine Grove. Albert Leonard, Pine Grove's first postmaster, lived in the area in 1854, in an inn that he built. It served as a popular spot to visit for those traveling between Jackson and Clinton.

References

Former settlements in Amador County, California
Former populated places in California
California Historical Landmarks